Michael Taiwo Akinkunmi OFR (born 10 May 1936) is a retired Nigerian civil servant. He is famous for designing Nigeria's national flag, and he is commonly called "Mr. Flag Man".

Early life and career 
Akinkunmi was born in Ibadan, of Yoruba origin, the older of a set of twins. He lived with his father until he was 8 years old before he relocated to the Northern part of Nigeria. He began his early education in the North. After his father's retirement, he came down to the West and was re-enrolled at Baptist Day School, Idi-Ikan in Ibadan. He finished from Baptist Day School Idi-kan in 1949 and proceeded to Ibadan Grammar School (IGS) in 1950 where he enjoyed a very good education.

He left IGS in 1955 and took an appointment as an agriculturist at the Western Region Secretariat in Ibadan as a civil servant. He would then work some years before gaining admission to the Norwood Technical College in London where he studied electrical engineering. While studying there, he designed the Nigerian Flag. He returned to Nigeria in 1963 and went back to the agricultural department at the secretariat in Ibadan to continue where he stopped. He worked as a civil servant until 1994 and retired as Assistant Superintendent of Agriculture. He was honoured with Officer of the order of Federal Republic (OFR)  and honorary life presidential adviser on 29 September 2014 at the Conference Centre Abuja.

Designing Nigeria's national flag 
He entered the competition which he came across in a library. In his own words, "I took details of what is [to be] expected to design a flag that would be used by a country that was about to witness [its] independence. I took part in the competition and my design was selected as the best in the year 1958." In 2021, Akinkunmi unveiled the world’s largest national flag in Ibadan, the Oyo state capital.

Personal life 
He is married with a wife and has children.

References

External links
 Minutes with the man who design Nigerian Flag, Thisdaylive
 Nigeria’s flag designer, PA TAIWO AKINKUNMI (77) finds joy in old age, Encomium Nigeria

1936 births
Living people
People from Ibadan
Flag designers
National symbols of Nigeria
Nigerian civil servants
Yoruba people
Ibadan Grammar School alumni
Nigerian twins
Officers of the Order of the Federal Republic